A phonorecord is defined by the United States Copyright Act of 1976 to be a material object that embodies sounds (other than those accompanying audio-visual recordings such as movies). 

From the Copyright Act: “Phonorecords” are material objects in which sounds, other than those accompanying a motion picture or other audiovisual work, are fixed by any method now known or later developed, and from which the sounds can be perceived, reproduced, or otherwise communicated, either directly or with the aid of a machine or device. The term “phonorecords” includes the material object in which the sounds are first fixed.

For example: all of the following are "phonorecords" under the law: A wire recording; a 16-rpm, 33-rpm, 45-rpm or 78-rpm phonograph record (vinyl disc), a reel-to-reel tape, an 8-track tape, a compact cassette tape, a compact disc, an audio DVD, and an MP3 file stored on a computer, compact disc or USB flash drive.

To explain the legal distinction between definitions, suppose a person or group takes a song and makes a performance.  The recorded performance is a sound recording (also called phonogram); the physical media that the sound recording is stored upon is a phonorecord.

References

Copyright law
Sound recording
Audio storage